Trichoptilus festus is a moth of the family Pterophoridae that is known from South Africa.

References

Endemic moths of South Africa
Oxyptilini
Moths described in 1920
Endemic fauna of South Africa
Moths of Africa